Otis Burt "Sonny" Shroyer Jr. (born August 28, 1935) is an American actor and singer who has appeared in various television and movie roles. He is known for his role as Deputy Sheriff Enos Strate in the television series The Dukes of Hazzard. He also starred in the short-lived spin-off series Enos based around his Dukes of Hazzard character. Shroyer is married and has two sons, Chris and Mark.

Shroyer was born in the town of Valdosta, Georgia. He attended Florida State University on a football scholarship, but his career was cut short by an injury. He finished his degree at the University of Georgia.

He began a career as a professional model in 1961. His first screen role came in the 1972 film Payday. Shroyer almost became typecast as a bad guy before landing the role of the naive Deputy Enos Strate in the hit pop culture series The Dukes of Hazzard in 1978 (first broadcast early 1979).

The Dukes of Hazzard role was Shroyer's most visible. His character was written out at the start of the third season to be given a spinoff series titled Enos in 1980. The new show was not a success and was canceled after eighteen episodes. Shroyer returned to The Dukes of Hazzard at the start of the fifth season in 1982 and remained with the series until it ended in 1985. Shroyer also released a children's album in 1982. The album was called Back in Hazzard and featured a cover of Roger Miller's classic, "You Can't Rollerskate In a Buffalo Herd". He also recorded a song "Children in Need" with fellow actor Randall Franks for Franks's 2001 CD God's Children. He and Franks have made personal appearances together.

Shroyer remains active as a character actor.  He portrayed University of Alabama coach Paul "Bear" Bryant in Forrest Gump, Delbert Birdsong in The Rainmaker, and Governor Jimmie Davis in Ray. He is also a country and gospel singer.

Filmography

Payday (1972) - Dabney
Sixteen (1973)
The Longest Yard (1974) - Tannen
Gator (1976) - 4th Agent
The Farmer (1977) - Corrigan
Roots (1977, TV Mini-Series) - Seaman Thompson (uncredited)
Smokey and the Bandit (1977) - Motorcycle cop (uncredited)
The Lincoln Conspiracy (1977) - Lewis Paine
The Million Dollar Dixie Deliverance (1978, TV Movie) - Luke
King (1978, TV Mini-Series) - Police Officer preventing King from visiting an injured friend (uncredited)
They Went That-A-Way & That-A-Way (1978) - Carlie
The Dukes of Hazzard (1979–1980, 1982–1985, TV Series) - Enos Strate
The Devil and Max Devlin (1981) - Big Billy Hunniker
Enos (1980-1981, TV Series) - Enos Strate
Alice TV Series (1983) "Mel Is Hog-Tied" - Deputy Enos Strate
In the Heat of the Night (1990, TV Series) - Emory Tanner
Love Crimes (1992) - Plainclothes Cop #1
In The Heat of the Night (1993, TV Series) - Dwight Foster
Forrest Gump (1994) - Bear Bryant
American Gothic (1995-1998, TV series) - Gage Temple
Bastard Out of Carolina (1996) - Sheriff
The Dukes of Hazzard: Reunion! (1997, TV Movie) - Enos Strate
Wild America (1997) - Bud
Paradise Falls (1997) - Bert Kyler
The Rainmaker (1997) - Delbert Birdsong
The Gingerbread Man (1998) - Chatham County Sheriff
Freedom Song (2000, TV Movie) - Police Chief
The Dukes of Hazzard: Hazzard in Hollywood (2000, TV Movie) - Enos Strate
Diggity's Treasure (2001) - Otis Cane
A Love Song for Bobby Long (2004) - Earl
Ray (2004) - Gov. Jimmie Davis (uncredited)
A Tale About Bootlegging (2005) - Sheriff Ed Cooper
The Hole in Willie's Guitar (2005, Memarie Music Video) - Sheriff
The Price (2008) - Ghost of Matthew Goldyn
Opening Day (2009) - Ray Hampton
The Way Home (2010) - Ed Walker
Unconditional (2012) - Pauly

External links
Sonny's Official website

1935 births
Living people
American male film actors
American male television actors
Florida State Seminoles football players
People from Valdosta, Georgia
Male actors from Georgia (U.S. state)
University of Georgia alumni
Florida State University alumni
Leon High School alumni